Reniê Almeida da Silva (born 10 April 1989) is a Brazilian footballer who plays as a centre back for Operário Ferroviário.

References

External links
Reniê at ZeroZero

1989 births
Living people
Brazilian footballers
Association football defenders
Campeonato Brasileiro Série A players
Campeonato Brasileiro Série B players
Campeonato Brasileiro Série C players
Campeonato Brasileiro Série D players
Atlético Clube Goianiense players
Esporte Clube Vitória players
Paysandu Sport Club players
Guarani Esporte Clube (MG) players
Tombense Futebol Clube players
Guarani FC players
Volta Redonda FC players
Vila Nova Futebol Clube players
Esporte Clube Santo André players
Mirassol Futebol Clube players